Armenia a land of rugged mountains and extinct volcanoes, its highest point is Mount Aragats, 13,435 ft (4,095 m).

Mountain ranges
 Javakheti mountain range
 Armeno-Georgian mountain range
 Bazum mountain range, spanning east–west in the Shirak and Lori provinces in Northern Armenia
 Pambak mountain range, spanning northwest–southeast in the Lori and Kotayk provinces
 Gugarik mountain range
 Oskepat mountain range
 Murghaz mountain range
 Areguni mountain range
 Sevan mountain range, east of Lake Sevan along the border with Azerbaijan
 Tsaghkuni mountain range
 Gegham mountain range
 Vardenis mountain range
 Vayots Dzor mountain range
 Zangezur mountain range, in the southern Armenian province of Syunik
 Bargushat mountain range
 Meghri mountain range

Prominent peaks

See also
List of volcanoes in Armenia
Mount Aragats
Zangezur Mountains

References 
 
 

 
Lists of landforms of Armenia
Armenia
Armenia
Armenia